Miguel 'Migue' Alberto García Díaz (born 17 April 1991) is a Spanish footballer who plays as a left back or a winger for Granada B.

Football career
García was born in Huelma, Jaén, Andalusia. A product of local Granada 74 CF's youth system, he began his senior career in amateur football with Atlético La Zubia. In the summer of 2011 he signed a contract with Granada CF, going on to play almost two full seasons for the reserves; on 13 May 2012, he appeared on the bench for the first team against Rayo Vallecano.

García renewed his contract with the Andalusians on 20 January 2013, extending his link with the club until 2015. Eight days later, he again was an unused substitute in a La Liga game, this time against Sevilla FC.

On 31 January 2013, García was loaned to SD Huesca until the end of the campaign. He made his Segunda División debut on 24 February, playing 11 minutes in a 1–3 away loss to Elche CF.

García returned to Granada in the 2013 off-season, being again assigned to the B-side in Segunda División B. On 16 January 2014 he was loaned to Cádiz CF of the same division, with the deal being renewed for a further season on 5 August.

On 31 August 2015, García signed a one-year deal with Racing de Santander also in the third level. On 8 July of the following year he moved to CF Reus Deportiu who had just promoted to the second tier, after agreeing to a two-year contract.

References

External links

1991 births
Living people
Spanish footballers
Footballers from Andalusia
Association football wingers
Segunda División players
Segunda División B players
Tercera División players
Divisiones Regionales de Fútbol players
Club Recreativo Granada players
SD Huesca footballers
Cádiz CF players
Racing de Santander players
CF Reus Deportiu players
UCAM Murcia CF players